Shadows on the Sage is a 1942 American Western "Three Mesquiteers" B-movie directed by Lester Orlebeck and starring Bob Steele, Tom Tyler, and Jimmie Dodd.

Cast 
 Bob Steele as Tucson Smith
 Tom Tyler as Stony Brooke
 Jimmie Dodd as Lullaby Joslin
 Cheryl Walker as Doris Jackson
 Harry Holman as Lippy
 Bryant Washburn as Banker John Carson
 Griff Barnett as Steve Jackson
 Freddie Mercer as Johnny Jackson
 Tom London as Franklin
 Yakima Canutt as Red Harvey, a Henchman

References

External links 
 
 

1942 films
1942 Western (genre) films
American Western (genre) films
American black-and-white films
Republic Pictures films
Three Mesquiteers films
Films directed by Lester Orlebeck
1940s English-language films
1940s American films